{{DISPLAYTITLE:C18H28O2}}
The chemical formula C18H28O2 (molar mass : 276.41 g/mol exact mass : 276.20893) may refer to:

 Bolandiol (19-norandrostenediol)
 5α-Dihydronandrolone
 19-Norandrosterone
 19-Noretiocholanolone
 Octadecatetraenoic acid
 alpha-Parinaric acid
 Stearidonic acid, an essential fatty acid